Saudi Space Commission (SSC) (Arabic: الهيئة السعودية للفضاء) is a Saudi independent government entity established by a royal order on December 27, 2018. The commission is chaired by Abdullah Alswaha, Saudi Minister of Communications and Information Technology.

Spaceflight
In 2022 was announced a partnership with Axiom Space to launch two Saudi astronauts to the International Space Station in 2023.

See also
 List of government space agencies

References 

Government of Saudi Arabia
Space agencies
Government agencies established in 2018
2018 establishments in Saudi Arabia